, also known Hachisuka Koroku (蜂須賀小六), was a daimyō, retainer and adviser of Toyotomi Hideyoshi during the Azuchi–Momoyama period of Japanese history. He was the son of Hachisuka Masatoshi.

The Hachisuka clan were the kokujin of the Kaitō District of Owari Province (in present-day Ama District, Aichi Prefecture). They controlled water transport on the Kiso River. Their knowledge of local terrain made them useful to the Oda and Saitō clans, although they remained independent of control of the powerful clans.

After the death of his father on 1553, Masakatsu left his hometown to serve as an attendant to Saitō Dōsan. Dōsan frequently relied upon Masakatsu for conflicts between those in Mino and Owari provinces. Masakatsu’s earlier name of Toshimasa matches an earlier name of Dōsan and is surmised to have been received from Dōsan. In 1556, at the Battle of Nagaragawa between Dōsan and Saitō Yoshitatsu, Masakatsu joined Dōsan’s forces.

After death of Dōsan, Masakatsu served Oda Nobunaga, under command of Toyotomi Hideyoshi, and may have participated in the building of Sunomata Castle (1567) and fought at the Siege of Inabayama (1568), also fought at the Battle of Anegawa (1570) against Azai and Asakura forces, as well as the Chugoku campaigns against the Mōri. 

In 1585, after Invasion of Shikoku, Hideyoshi awarded him Awa Province as a fief, but he declined in favor of his son, Iemasa, and serving instead as a close adviser of Hideyoshi.

Family

 Father: Hachisuka Masatoshi (d. 1553)
 Mother: daughter of Yasui Shigeyuki
 Wife: Matsu later Daishou'in (d. 1611)
 Concubine: Hakun'in
 Children:
 Hachisuka Iemasa (1558-1639) by Matsu
 Narahime (d. 1606) married Kashima Nagamasa by Matsu
 Itohime (1571–1645) married Kuroda Nagamasa by Hakun'in

References 
 Hachisuka Masakatsu (in Japanese)

Further reading 

1526 births
1586 deaths
Daimyo
Hachisuka clan
People from Ama, Aichi
Toyotomi retainers